Marcelino dos Santos (20 May 1929 – 11 February 2020) was a Mozambican poet, revolutionary, and politician. As a young man he travelled to Portugal, and France for an education. He was a founding member of the Frente de Libertação de Moçambique (FRELIMO—Mozambican Liberation Front), in 1962, and served as the party's deputy president from 1969 to 1977. He was Minister of Economic Development in the late 1970s, Frelimo Political Bureau member in charge of the economy in the early 1980s, Chairman of the country's parliament, the Assembly of the Republic, from 1987 to 1994, and, as of 1999, remained a member of the Frelimo Central Committee. He represented the left wing of the party, remaining an avowed Marxist-Leninist, despite the party's embrace of capitalism in recent decades, an embrace which dos Santos declared was temporary.

Under the pseudonyms Kalungano and Lilinho Micaia, he published his early poems in O Brado Africano, and his work appeared in two anthologies produced by the Casa dos Estudantes do Imperio in Lisbon. Under the pen-name Lilinho Micaia, a collection of his poetry was published in the Soviet Union. Under his real name, he had a book published by the Associação dos Escritores Moçambicanos (Mozambican Writers' Association) in 1987, entitled Canto do Amor Natural.

Early life 
Marcelino dos Santos was born May 20, 1929 in Lumbo, Mozambique. His father was Firmino dos Santos and his mother was Tereza Sabina dos Santos.  Firmino dos Santos was a political activist belonging to the African Association of Mozambique.  He grew up in Lourenço Marques (now Maputo) the capital of Mozambique.  He started working at a factory under the control of the Portugal labor regime and came face to face with the violence and racism against the factory workers in Mozambique.  With his father's political affiliations and these early labor experience Dos Santos began to put together his own ideas.  When he was 18 he left Mozambique to go to school in Lisbon, Portugal it was there where he expressed his fathers ideas of unity among those oppressed by Portugals colonialism through his writing and poems. At the House for Students of the Empire in Lisbon, dos Santos and others increasingly spread their nationalist sentiments. Some of the men dos Santos overlapped and shared his ideas with were Amilcar Cabral, Agostinho Neto, and Eduardo Mondlane all eventual nationalist leaders in Guinea Bissau, Angola, and Mozambique.

Exile in Paris 
In the early 1950s these nationalist speaking students came to attention of the Portuguese political police and so Dos Santos and others decided to flee to various other countries Dos Santos escaped to France where he worked with many other exiled African nationalists.   In Paris dos Santos lived among leftist African writers and artists who were part of the literary journal Presence Africaine. using the pen names — Kalungano in Portuguese language publications and Lilinho Micaia for the collection of his poetry published in the Soviet Union he proceeded to publish several poems. In the 1950s  he urged Portuguese political exiles in Paris to continue and increase their opposition to the Salazar regime in Portugal and embrace the nationalist cause for Africa. He played a large role in the formation of the Anti-Colonial Movement (MAC) in Paris in 1957. He joined the Paris branch of the Uniao Democratica Nacional de Mocambique, that was a nationalist groups that merged to create the Frente de Libertacao de Mocambique (Frelimo). He was involved in the founding of the Conference of Nationalist Organisations of the Portuguese Colonies (CONCP) at Casablanca, and elected permanent secretary in charge of co-ordinating nationalist activity.

Frelimo Founding 
Eduardo Mondlane one of the very influential African nationalists dos Santos had gotten to know in Portugal decided to try and put in motion the ideas of a united front for African colonies under Portuguese role to start the fight for independence, and dos Santos lent his support.  The connections that Marcelino and Mondlane made in their youth as scholars were a crucial part of Frelimo's success as Julius Nyerere pledged support to Mozambique operating out of Tanzania.  While Marcelino and others who had studied in Portugal were the ones who made up the founders.  This was founding of the Front for the Liberation of Mozambique (Frelimo). Frelimo, the party which undertook and waged the war for independence from Portugal, held its first congress in Tanzania in September 1962.  The three major Mozambican parties that were UDENAMO (Uniao Oemocratica Nac1onal de Mocambique); MANU (Mozambique African Nationalist Union); and UNAHI (Uniao Africana de Hocambique lndependente) combined to form Frelimo.

Frelimo Policies 
Since Frelimo was a liberation movement they were very dependent on help and support from different nations and organizations.  Ways of acquiring supplies and arms for guerrilla warfare were part of the goal but also there was a strong focus on gaining support from the U.N.  In process of gaining others support the party hoped to distance and isolate Portugal from the rest of the world believing that this would significantly weaken their hold on the African colonies.  Many different countries contributed to Frelimo's cause a number of African countries helped seeing that no African state could be free with white colonialism existing in Africa.  Socialist countries such as the Soviet Union and China contributed substantially to the efforts the Soviet Union was especially helpful because of their place on the U.N. Security Council where they continued to vote against Portuguese colonialization. The proposed spending of Frelimo is meant to be on military action against Portugal.  With Mondlane at the head as president of Frelimo they appeal to human freedom, democracy and world peace.

Marcelino's Wife 
Pamele dos Santos (nee Beira) was born in Johannesburg in South Africa on 19 June 1942 to Banny and Golda Beira.  She joined the  African National Congress (ANC) November, 1961 dos Santos and Joe Louw were arrested under the Immorality Act. They were charged and went to trial. She decided to leave South Africa and ended up in Tanzania where she quickly met Marcelino dos Santos.  Pamela and Marcelino had a daughter in Oct 1963 and eventually married in 1968.  Both Mondlane and Marcelino dos Santos were married to white women. Problems arose as some thought it was hypocritical of these leaders to discuss how to fight white domination in Mozambique while being married to a white woman.

Political career 

Mondlane, the rather moderate leader of Frelimo who had been a lecturer in the USA and a United l\jations official, was murdered on 2 February 1969, with the clear involvement of the pro-Soviet faction within Frelimo under Uria Simango and Samora Machel.  His death was very mysterious and was no murderer was ever brought to justice but what this event did was throw Marcelino into a very important role Marcelino dos Santos was elected to Frelimo's 3 person ruling system (dos Santos, Uria Simango, and Samora Moises Machel). In the late 1970s, Dos Santos was Minister of Economic Development. He was a member of the Frelimo Political Bureau in charge of the economy in the early 1980s. From 1987 to 1994, Dos Santos was chairperson of the country's Parliament, the Assembly of the Republic. He represented the left wing of the party and was a Marxist-Leninist. Although the political party may have begun to look into adopting ideas of capitalism Dos Santos was stubborn not accepting it and calling these motions brief.  He became head of the most reforming parliament in Mozambican history - which got rid one party state, replacing it with political pluralism, approved a Constitution of the Republic which included guarantees for freedom of assembly, freedom of expression and freedom of the press, and even changed the county's name - from People's Republic to Republic of Mozambique. But still kept his stance on Socialism.

U.S Relations 
Once Mozambique is a free country no longer under Portuguese rule Marcelino dos Santos wants to create bonds with the U.S.

Goals of developing economic relations and receiving aid on bandits who are keeping Mozambique at war.  Cooperation with U.S. for emergencies such as bandits and droughts and for agriculture even if the U.S had given off idea of being focused on the private sector.  Marcelino dos Santos says "Although it took some time for our views to be shared by the U.S., I think they are closer than in the past and sufficiently near to enable us to take strong steps forwards in order to bring about peace and promote economic and social development."

End of Life 
July 1, 1970 Marcelino was invited to the Vatican by the Pope where he was given a copy of the papal encyclical Populorum Progressio on the problems of the underdeveloped world.  The next year he received the Lenin Centenary Medal.  The war with Renamo had finally wrapped up  in 1992 when Frelimo and Renam signed a treaty but the expenses made the country one of the poorest ones. Declared national hero in 2015 by Mozambicans.  Died Feb 11 2020.  "Therefore, in life as in death, Marcelino dos Santos, the philosopher's griot, remains an icon in the African's story of toil in the wake of colonialism and neo-colonialism which call for a respective response to collective suffering."

"A people cannot say farewell to their history.”- Marcelino dos Santos

References

Sources 

 Bookrags Encyclopedia of World Biography (accessed December 2007).
 Mozambique News Agency interview (accessed December 2007).

External links 

 Interview with Marcelino dos Santos by Tor Sellström within the project Nordic Documentation on the Liberation Struggle in Southern Africa

1929 births
2020 deaths
Presidents of the Assembly of the Republic (Mozambique)
Mozambican writers
Socialist realism writers
Communist writers
Communist poets
Mozambican communists
Anti-revisionists
FRELIMO politicians
Recipients of the Order of the Companions of O. R. Tambo
Mozambican independence activists
People from Nampula Province